Arthur Brown Jones was an American Negro league infielder in the 1920s.

Jones played for the Birmingham Black Barons in 1925, and for the St. Louis Stars the following season. In six recorded career games, he posted one hit in seven plate appearances.

References

External links
 and Seamheads

Year of birth missing
Year of death missing
Place of birth missing
Place of death missing
Birmingham Black Barons players
St. Louis Stars (baseball) players